LeadPoint, Inc. is a software and information technology services company for the lead generation industry located in Los Angeles, California.  The company operates a business-to-business exchange for data and voice leads in numerous verticals including: consumer lending, consumer credit, and education.  Leadpoint UK declared bankruptcy in November 2013.

Background

LeadPoint, Inc. was formed in 2004 by Marc Diana (chairman and CEO).  A private company, LeadPoint is ventured backed by Redpoint Ventures and Silicon Valley Bank Ventures.  

In 2006 the company launched a United Kingdom division.

LeadPoint's Board of Directors includes Scott Ingraham, co-founder of Rent.com. The company was recognized as the 4th Fastest Growing Digital Media Company in Europe.

External links
LeadPoint, Inc. (company website)

References

Financial services companies of the United States
Financial services companies established in 2004
Software companies established in 2004
Companies based in Los Angeles